The 1889 Crescent Athletic Club football team was an American football team that represented the Crescent Athletic Club in the American Football Union (AFU) during the 1889 college football season. The team compiled a 6–1 record (4–0 against AFU opponents), won the AFU championship, and played its home games at Washington Park in Brooklyn. William H. Ford was the team captain.  Other key players included Harry Beecher at quarterback, Wyllys Terry at halfback, and Henry J. Lamarche at guard. Alex Moffatt has also been reported as a member of the team.

Prior to the start of the season, the Crescent Club merged with the Nereid Boat Club which, according to Allison Danzig, "placed the Crescents in the very front rank of athletic organizations of similar character."

Schedule

Roster
 Harry Beecher
 Hunter Brown
 Billy Bull
 Charlie Chapman
 Duncan Edwards
 Billy Ford
 Henry J. Lamarche
 John Lamarche
 Mat. Lamarche
 Paul Lamarche
 Harry Sheldon
 Wyllys Terry
 Fred Vernon
 Joe Vernon

 Frank Lawrence, manager

References

Crescent Athletic Club
Crescent Athletic Club football seasons
Crescent Athletic Club Football